The Pittsburgh Forge are a defunct Junior A Tier II ice hockey team based in Pittsburgh, Pennsylvania, which played in the North American Hockey League (NAHL). The team was founded in 2001 by Kevin Constantine, a former coach of the NHL's Pittsburgh Penguins. They played at the Island Sports Center. The team compiled an 80-24-8 record in the first and only two seasons. The Forge were finalists in the Robertson Cup Tournament, the NAHL championship, during their inaugural season and were the first expansion team to do so. During their second season, the Forge set a national Junior A record with 43 wins and won the NAHL's regular season championship as well as the Robertson Cup Tournament. In two seasons, the Forge advanced 18 players onto scholarships with Division I college hockey programs. In 2003, the franchise was sold to investors in Toledo, Ohio and was relocated as the Toledo IceDiggers.

Players
The final roster of the 2002–03 NAHL national champion Forge – the last Forge team – and their scholarship schools: Randy Bauer, Sean Berkstresser (Robert Morris), Tom Biondich (Robert Morris), Andy Brandt (Wisconsin), Jace Buzek (Robert Morris), Ben Camper (Colgate), Josh Coyle (Union), John Dingle (Ohio State), Joe Federoff (Alabama Huntsville), Josef Fotjik, Jim Gehring (Mercyhurst), Mike Handza (Denver), Denis Kirstien (Mercyhurst), Chris Lawrence (Michigan State), Mike Mannina, Peter Mannino (Denver), Matt McBride, Dylan Reese (Harvard), Gabe Rehak, Daniel Shildorfer, Erix Trax (Robert Morris), Brandon Warner (Michigan State), Ryan Webb, Matt Zeman,

Season-by-season records

References

Forge
Forge
Defunct North American Hockey League teams
Ice hockey clubs established in 2001
Ice hockey clubs disestablished in 2003
2001 establishments in Pennsylvania
2003 disestablishments in Pennsylvania